Leuk Daek District is a district (srok) of Kandal Province, Cambodia. The district is subdivided into 7 communes (khum) (Kampong Phnum, K'am Samnar, Khpob ateav, Peam Reang, Preaek Dach, Preaek Tonloab, Sandar) and 24 villages (phum).

References

External links
Kandal at Royal Government of Cambodia website
Kandal at Ministry of Commerce website

Districts of Kandal province